Mount Thomlinson is a mountain in the Babine Range of the Skeena Mountains in northern British Columbia, Canada, located at the head of Thomlinson Creek, southeast of the junction of Babine River and Skeena River and north of Hazelton. Thomlinson is one of the most isolated mountains of Canada.

References

External links
 "Mount Thomlinson, British Columbia" on Peakbagger

Two-thousanders of British Columbia
Skeena Mountains
Cassiar Land District